Dorea longicatena  is a Gram-positive, obligately anaerobic, non-spore-forming and rod-shaped bacterium from the genus of Dorea which has been isolated from human feces in Germany.

References 

Lachnospiraceae
Bacteria described in 2002